Panasonic Lumix DMC-TZ35 is a digital camera by Panasonic Lumix. The highest-resolution pictures it records is 16.1 megapixels, through its 24mm Ultra Wide-Angle Leica DC VARIO-ELMAR.

Property
24 mm LEICA DC
20x optical zoom
High Sensitivity MOS sensor
Venus Engine
Full HD movies
POWER O.I.S.

References

External links

DMC-TZ35 on panasonic.it
Panasonic Lumix DMC-TZ35 review

Point-and-shoot cameras
TZ35